In differential geometry, pushforward is a linear approximation of smooth maps on tangent spaces. It can be viewed as a generalization of the total derivative of ordinary calculus.

Motivation 

between their tangent spaces.

The differential of a smooth map 
Let  be a smooth map of smooth manifolds.

If tangent vectors are defined as equivalence classes of the curves  for which  then the differential is given by

Alternatively, if tangent vectors are defined as derivations acting on smooth real-valued functions, then the differential is given by

for an arbitrary function  and an arbitrary derivation  at point  (a derivation is defined as a linear map  that satisfies the Leibniz rule, see: definition of tangent space via derivations).

Extending by linearity gives the following matrix

Thus the differential is a linear transformation, between tangent spaces, associated to the smooth map  at each point. In general, the differential need not be invertible. However, if  is a local diffeomorphism, then  is invertible, and the inverse gives the pullback of 

The differential is frequently expressed using a variety of other notations such as

It follows from the definition that the differential of a composite is the composite of the differentials (i.e., functorial behaviour). This is the chain rule for smooth maps.

Also, the differential of a local diffeomorphism is a linear isomorphism of tangent spaces.

The differential on the tangent bundle 

In this way,  is a functor.

Pushforward of vector fields 
Given a smooth map  and a vector field X on M, it is not usually possible to identify a pushforward of X by φ with some vector field Y on N. For example, if the map φ is not surjective, there is no natural way to define such a pushforward outside of the image of φ. Also, if φ is not injective there may be more than one choice of pushforward at a given point. Nevertheless, one can make this difficulty precise, using the notion of a vector field along a map.

A section of φ∗TN over M is called a vector field along φ. For example, if M is a submanifold of N and φ is the inclusion, then a vector field along φ is just a section of the tangent bundle of N along M; in particular, a vector field on M defines such a section via the inclusion of TM inside TN. This idea generalizes to arbitrary smooth maps.

Suppose that X is a vector field on M, i.e., a section of TM. Then,  yields, in the above sense, the pushforward φ∗X, which is a vector field along φ, i.e., a section of φ∗TN over M.

A vector field X on M and a vector field Y on N are said to be φ-related if  as vector fields along φ. In other words, for all x in M, .

In some situations, given a X vector field on M, there is a unique vector field Y on N which is φ-related to X. This is true in particular when φ is a diffeomorphism. In this case, the pushforward defines a vector field Y on N, given by

A more general situation arises when φ is surjective (for example the bundle projection of a fiber bundle). Then a vector field X on M is said to be projectable if for all y in N, dφx(Xx) is independent of the choice of x in φ−1({y}). This is precisely the condition that guarantees that a pushforward of X, as a vector field on N, is well defined.

Examples

Pushforward from multiplication on Lie groups 
Given a Lie group , we can use the multiplication map  to get left multiplication  and right multiplication  maps . For example, given  we get an associated vector field  on  defined byfor every . This can be readily computed using the curves definition of pushforward maps.

Pushforward for some Lie groups 
Then, forwe havewhich is equal to the original set of matrices. This is not always the case, for example, in the groupwe have its Lie algebra as the set of matriceshence for some matrixwe havewhich is not the same set of matrices.

See also
Pullback (differential geometry)
Flow-based generative model

References 

 
  See section 1.6.
  See section 1.7 and 2.3.

Generalizations of the derivative
Differential geometry
Smooth functions